Desmond Morrah Brain (16 December 1909 – 1 March 1990) played first-class cricket for Tasmania in three matches in 1930-31. He was born at Hobart, Tasmania and died at Tumut, New South Wales.

See also
 List of Tasmanian representative cricketers

References

External links
 

1909 births
1990 deaths
Australian cricketers
Tasmania cricketers
Cricketers from Hobart